Club Deportivo San Martín  was Spanish football club based in Sotrondio, San Martín del Rey Aurelio in the autonomous community of Asturias. Founded in 1950 and dissolved in 2012, San Martín played its home games at Estadio El Florán.

History
After a long time spent in Tercera División, also qualifying several times for the promotion playoffs and the Copa del Rey, the club started its decline in the 2000s. On 13 March 2012, San Martín was excluded from the fifth division after two consecutive forfeits and the club was dissolved.

Club naming
Sociedad Deportiva Rey Aurelio 1992–1996
Club Deportivo San Martín 1996–2012

Season to season

39 seasons in Tercera División

References

External links
BDFutbol profile

Defunct football clubs in Spain
Association football clubs established in 1950
2012 disestablishments in Spain
Association football clubs disestablished in 2012
Sporting de Gijón